Department of Public Utilities Howard (Overbrook) Road Facility is a historic material storage, repair facility and office complex located in Richmond, Virginia. The complex was begun in 1925, and consists of consists of three brick and concrete buildings, a two-story stucco building and a row of metal and brick storage sheds.

It was listed on the National Register of Historic Places in 2007.

References

Government buildings on the National Register of Historic Places in Virginia
Buildings and structures completed in 1925
Buildings and structures in Richmond, Virginia
National Register of Historic Places in Richmond, Virginia